Esther Warkov  (born 1941) is a Canadian artist. Warkov is known for her large, segmented Surrealist paintings and detailed drawings that invoke a fantasy world in their imagery.

Career
Warkov was born in Winnipeg, Manitoba. From 1958 to 1961 she studied with Richard Williams and George Swinton at the University of Manitoba.

Warkov evokes a feeling of long-ago times in her work by placing images which hint at the past in cut-outs next to images which may present times nearer the present.  She admires Jack Chambers and ascribes his influence to her way of addressing reality. The mood she evokes is of a gentle melancholy. But, as one writer pointed out, Warkov's intellectual tools are symbol, allegory and narrative, and these may not always be immediately accessible for the art viewer.

In 1964, the Winnipeg Art Gallery presented her first solo exhibition. In 1985, the Winnipeg Gallery held an exhibition titled Esther Warkov: Recent Drawings. In 1998, her paper relief constructions were shown there. In 2000, her exhibition House of Tea was shown at the National Gallery of Canada, Ottawa. Her work is included in the collections of the National Gallery of Canada, the Winnipeg Art Gallery, the Beaverbrook Art Gallery, Fredericton, the Montreal Museum of Fine Arts, and the Vancouver Art Gallery, among others.

In 1974, she was elected a member of the Royal Canadian Academy of Arts.

References

Bibliography 

1941 births
Living people
20th-century Canadian artists
20th-century Canadian women artists
21st-century Canadian artists
21st-century Canadian women artists
Artists from Winnipeg
Canadian surrealist artists
Members of the Royal Canadian Academy of Arts
Jewish Canadian  artists